The , or GR 8 for short, is a long distance hiking trail on the French Atlantic coast.  It is part of the Grande Randonnée network and runs from Saint-Brevin-les-Pins (Loire-Atlantique, France) on the south of the Loire estuary, opposite the large port city of Saint-Nazaire and currently terminates at Sare in the  Atlantic Pyrenees.

Route
The path descends from the Côte de Jade of the Pays de Retz, through the Vendée and Charente-Maritime towards Royan, takes the ferry over the Gironde estuary and continues in the Gironde then the Landes, while following the Atlantic coast, before crossing the Adour further east, in Urt continuing south-west to Sare, the current trail head. There it joins the GR 10 which continues westward to Hendaye near the Spanish border and town of Irun and eastward through the Pyrénées-Atlantiques. The path therefore traverses six coastal administrative departments in two regions: Loire-Atlantique and Vendée in the Pays de Loire, and Charente-Maritime, Gironde, Landes and Pyrénées-Atlantiques in Nouvelle-Aquitaine.

Description
The GR 8 is the youngest of the ten main routes (GR 1 to GR 10) of the French hiking network and has not yet been completely demarcated. However, several small gaps in the route can be easily filled by using other walking routes, such as the GR 364 at Talmont-Saint-Hilaire, the GR 360 and the GR 4 between Rochefort and Royan, and the Way of Saint James (the ) south of the Gironde estuary.
In this latter area of Aquitaine, the GR 8 was almost completely defined and marked, but a number of private owners since prohibited the passage of GR walkers, so that a new route has to be found. In the vicinity of La Rochelle, hikers will have to find a suitable route for the time being.

The GR 8 is part of the E9 European long distance path linking Estonia with Portugal.

References

External links

 
 

Hiking trails in France

Geography of Loire-Atlantique
Geography of Vendée
Geography of Charente-Maritime
Geography of Gironde
Geography of Landes (department)
Geography of Pyrénées-Atlantiques

Tourist attractions in Loire-Atlantique
Tourist attractions in Vendée
Tourist attractions in Charente-Maritime
Tourist attractions in Gironde
Tourist attractions in Landes (department)
Tourist attractions in Pyrénées-Atlantiques